Knútsdrápur (plural of Knútsdrápa) are Old Norse skaldic compositions in the form of drápur which were recited for the praise of Canute the Great. There are a number of these:

 The Knútsdrápa by Óttarr svarti
 The Knútsdrapa by Sigvatr Þórðarson
 Eight poetic fragments thought to derive from a single Knútsdrapa by Hallvarðr háreksblesi

Further reading
Townend, Matthew. "Contextualising the Knútsdrápur: Skaldic Praise-Poetry at the Court of Cnut." Anglo-Saxon England 30 (2001): 145-79.  Abstract of his paper (same title) for the 11th International Saga Conference available as online PDF.

Skaldic poems